Place Bell is a multi-purpose arena in Laval, Quebec, Canada. The complex includes a 10,000 seat main arena which is the home of the Laval Rocket of the American Hockey League and two smaller community ice rinks, one of which has Olympic size ice.

History
Then-mayor of Laval, Gilles Vaillancourt, announced the project on February 13, 2012.  The facility is managed by Evenko, the same company that operates the Bell Centre in Montreal, home of the Montreal Canadiens of the National Hockey League. As in the case of the Bell Centre, the naming rights for the Laval arena were acquired by Bell Canada.  The cost of the project roughly doubled since it was first announced. Originally announced by Vaillancourt in 2012 to cost $92.6 million, the estimate was revised less than a year later to $150 million. In March 2014, Laval's new mayor Marc Demers estimated that the cost of Place Bell would double to $200 million, because of costs not factored by the previous administration. The Government of Quebec committed to contributing $46 million; Demers asked that the province assume more of the costs, as it did for other arena projects.

Initial plans called for the arena to be built in the city's Quartier de l'Agora district, next to the Laval courthouse, but the unstable soil in that location led to a move.  In October 2012, the city announced that the project would be located adjacent to the Montmorency station of the Montreal Metro Orange Line.

Construction started in late 2014 and was completed in 2017.

On 11 July 2016, the Montreal Canadiens announced it would relocate its American Hockey League affiliate, then known as the St. John's IceCaps, to Place Bell in 2017. On 8 September 2016, the Canadiens announced the team would be named the Laval Rocket.

On 20 September 2018, it was announced that the Les Canadiennes de Montreal of the Canadian Women's Hockey League would be moving to the arena complex from Complexe sportif Claude-Robillard playing both in the main rink and the community rink. The Les Canadiennes also moved their daily operations and training camp into the complex. They played one season at Place Bell before the league and team ceased operations in 2019.

References

External links
Press release regarding naming rights agreement
Official Website

Buildings and structures in Laval, Quebec
Indoor arenas in Quebec
Sport in Laval, Quebec
Sports venues completed in 2017
Bell Canada
Laval Rocket
Les Canadiennes de Montreal